The 1915 Ilford rail crash occurred on 1 January 1915 when an express passenger train passed a signal at danger and collided with another passenger train that was stopped at Ilford railway station on the Great Eastern Main Line in Essex, England. Ten people died and approximately 500 complained of injury.

Collision
At approximately 08:40 on 1 January 1915 the crew of the 07:06 express service from Clacton to London Liverpool Street failed to see that the distant and home signals at the Ilford east signal box were at danger. The signalman tried to attract their attention by shouting and waving a red flag from the signal box, but to no avail. The impact completely destroyed the eighth coach and severely damaged five others of the Gidea Park train, as well as the engine and first two vehicles of the Clacton train. Ten passengers died and over 500 complained of injury.

The official report attributed blame to the driver of the Clacton train for his "insufficient care in noting the positions of his signals when approaching Ilford". It also noted that the accident would have been much less likely if some form of Automatic Warning System had been in use, and recommended its introduction.

See also
 Ilford rail crash (1944)

Sources

Railway accidents and incidents in London
Railway accidents in 1915
1915 in England
Rail transport in Essex
Railway accidents and incidents in Essex
Transport in the London Borough of Redbridge
1915 in London
Accidents and incidents involving Great Eastern Railway
1910s in Essex
Rail crash
1915 disasters in the United Kingdom
January 1915 events
Train collisions in England